Caterziane Fonseca Ferreira (born 8 March 1979 in Icatu, Maranhão), known as Cate Fonseca, is Brazilian footballer who currently plays for Adriatiku Mamurrasi in the Albanian First Division.

References

1979 births
Living people
Brazilian footballers
Kategoria Superiore players
Association football midfielders
Brazilian expatriate sportspeople in Albania
Expatriate footballers in Albania
KS Lushnja players
Luftëtari Gjirokastër players
Olympiacos Volos F.C. players
KS Kastrioti players
KF Adriatiku Mamurrasi players
Sportspeople from Maranhão